Baitakkol, is a lake in Yrgyz District, Aktobe Region, Kazakhstan.

The area surrounding the lake is arid, featuring an extremely continental climate and cold winters with little snowfall. Summers are hot with strong winds.

Geography
It is a long lake, the largest of the group of lakes in the valley of the lower Turgay. It is roughly aligned from SW to NE, in the same direction as smaller lakes and salt pans nearby. Lake Keltekol lies to the south of the central part. The northwestern end of the lake connects via an intermittent channel with the right bank of the Turgay, which flows southwards to the east of the lake cluster.

Baitakkol is a floodplain lake that is filled during the spring floods of the Turgay river. During that period the water becomes fresh. After the spring flood is over, water flows back towards the Turgay river through the channel at the northeastern end. In the dry seasons the lake shrinks and its water turns brackish. 

In recent years the lake has become critically shallow owing to lack of floodwater inflow.

Fauna
There are reedbeds along the lakeshore and sedges grow in the floodplain meadows. Baitakkol is a key refuge for aquatic birds, including the critically endangered siberian crane.

See also
List of lakes of Kazakhstan
Lakes of the lower Turgay and Irgiz

References

External links
Turgay nature reserve - Sightseeing tours in Kazakhstan.
 В Актюбинской области под угрозой исчезновения находится уникальный Иргиз-Торгайский природный заказник

Lakes of Aktobe Region
Endorheic lakes of Asia